Maudlin's Cemetery is a Church of Ireland cemetery located in Naas, Ireland. It is notable for its two large pyramid-shaped mausoleums, and as the burial place of much of the local aristocracy.

History

The name is archaically spelled Maudlings; derives from Mary Magdalene, often depicted in art as mourning for Jesus after his crucifixion, and thus associated with burial grounds (cf. maudlin). At the time of the dissolution of the monasteries (c. 1540), Great Connell Priory was noted as possessing seven acres near to "the Maudelein of Naas." By 1606 the lands at Maudlings belonged to the chantry priests of St. David's Church, Naas.

The cemetery dates to a 1780 donation by John Bourke, 1st Earl of Mayo; it was enclosed in 1782, although the oldest surviving inscription is from 1828.

The west pyramid was built in honour of Anne de Burgh, wife of Walter Hussey Burgh, while the east pyramid is unmarked but believed to belong to another member of the De Burgh family.

The cemetery was expanded in 1889.

The Journal of the Co. Kildare Archaeological Society recorded in 1895 that grave-robbing took place at Maudlin's, with the body of Moorehead, former governor of Naas Gaol, being one of the victims.

The two pyramids were restored in 2020 with €65,000 from the Follies Trust.

Notable burials
Earls of Mayo
Robert Bourke, 5th Earl of Mayo
the Earls of Clonmell

the De Burghs of Oldtown
Hubert de Burgh (1879–1960)
Eric de Burgh, general
the De Robecks of Gowran Grange.
Alexander Taylor (1746–1828), cartographer

Gallery

References

External links
Maudlin's Cemetery at historicgraves.com

Cemeteries in County Kildare
Religion in County Kildare
Naas
1782 establishments in Ireland